Benjamin Basso (born 2 July 2001) is a speedway rider from Denmark.

Speedway career 
Basso, who was a World Youth champion was signed by Poole Pirates during the SGB Championship 2021 season as a replacement for Ondřej Smetana, who had failed to join the team due to travel issues. The move contributed to a highly successful season for the Pirates as they won the league and Knockout Cup double.

In 2022, he rode for the Peterborough Panthers in the SGB Premiership 2022 and for the Glasgow Tigers in the SGB Championship 2022. The move from Poole to Peterborough upset the Poole managers Matt and Dan Ford because they said that they had assisted Basso with his work permit and arranged a contract around Basso's Danish racing commitments. However Basso stated that the clash of race days was unmanageable. Also in 2022, he finished in 5th place during the World Under-21 Championship in the 2022 SGP2. Also in 2022, he helped SES win the 2022 Danish Super League.

In 2023, he re-signed for both Peterborough in the SGB Premiership 2023 and Glasgow in the SGB Championship 2023.

References 

Living people
2001 births
Danish speedway riders
Glasgow Tigers riders
Peterborough Panthers riders
Poole Pirates riders
Sportspeople from Odense